Le Gouverneur General de l'ile Chakerbakerben (English: The Governor of Chakerbakerben Island) is a 1980 Moroccan film directed by Nabyl Lahlou.

Synopsis 
Al Gharbi works in the telex booth of a newspaper. One day, he receives a dispatch about an island whose governor has disappeared.

Cast 

 Nabyl Lahlou
 Fouad Dziri
 Mohamed Miftah 
 Noureddine Bikr

References 

1980 films
Moroccan drama films
1980s Arabic-language films
Films directed by Nabyl Lahlou
1980 drama films